Shraga is a Jewish given name (meaning "candle" in Talmudic Aramaic) and may refer to:

Samuel ben Uri Shraga Phoebus, Polish rabbi and Talmudist of Woydyslaw in the second half of the 17th century
Shraga Bar (born 1948), former Israeli football defender, who played for the Israel national team between 1968 and 1972
Shraga Feivish Hager the rebbe of the Kosov Hasidic dynasty, dayan ("rabbinic judge"), and noted orator
Shraga Feivel Mendlowitz (1886–1948), early leader of American Orthodoxy and founder of key institutions such as Torah Vodaath
Shraga Feivel Zimmerman, the ABD (Town rabbi) of the Jewish community in Gateshead
Shraga Goren (1898–1972), Israeli politician
Shraga Simmons (born 1961), influential rabbi involved in kiruv (Jewish outreach)
Shraga Weil (1918–2009), Israeli painter
Shraga Weinberg (born 1966), Israeli wheelchair tennis player
Yechezkel Shraga Halberstam, (1813–1898), the eldest son of the Divrei Chaim, Rabbi Chaim Halberstam of Sanz
Shraga Weiss, (1981–present), the middle son of Jacob and Susan Weiss. Renowned international animated film artist and philanthropist.

See also
Torat Shraga (or Yeshivas Toras Shraga), a post-high school yeshiva in Bayit Vegan, Jerusalem, Israel